Edgeley Municipal Airport  is a public airport located one mile (1.6 km) southwest of the central business district of Edgeley, in LaMoure County, North Dakota, United States. It is owned by the Edgeley Municipal Airport Authority.

Facilities and aircraft

For the 12-month period ending September 25, 2000, the airport had 230 aircraft operations: 87% general aviation, 9% air taxi, and 4% military.

References

External links

Airports in North Dakota
Buildings and structures in LaMoure County, North Dakota
Transportation in LaMoure County, North Dakota